Al-Nasr Sports, Cultural and Social Club or simply Al-Nasr Benghazi is a Libyan professional football club based in Benghazi.

Honours

National titles
Libyan Premier League
Winners (2): 1987,2017–18.
Runners-up (4): 1977–78, 1983–84, 2001–02,

Libyan Cup
Winners (3): 1997, 2003, 2010.

Libyan Super Cup winner (1) 2018
Runners-up (3): 1997, 2003, 2010

Regional titles
North African Cup Winners Cup
Runners-up (1): 2010

Performance in CAF competitions
 African Cup of Champions Clubs & CAF Champions League: 4 appearances
1988 – First Round
2018–19 – First Round
2019–20 – First Round
2020–21 – Preliminary Round

CAF Confederation Cup: 3 appearances
2004 – First Round
2011 – withdrew in First Round
2019–20 – Quarter-finals

CAF Cup: 1 appearance
2003 – Second Round

CAF Cup Winners' Cup: 2 appearances
1979 – Second Round
1983 – First Round
1985 – withdrew in Semi-Finals

Current squad
2009–10 season

References

Sport in Benghazi
Nasr
Association football clubs established in 1954
1954 establishments in Libya